Peter Little (born 26 December 1933) is a British modern pentathlete. He competed at the 1960 Summer Olympics in the modern pentathlon, finishing 26th individually and 7th in the team standings.

References

External links
 
 

1933 births
Living people
British male modern pentathletes
Olympic modern pentathletes of Great Britain
Modern pentathletes at the 1960 Summer Olympics
People from Wellington, Shropshire